Pisagua Airport,  is an airstrip  east of the Pacific coastal village of Pisagua, in the  Tarapacá Region of Chile.

The airstrip sits on a mesa high above the village. There is rising terrain to the east, and a steep drop to the Pacific to the west. The runway end markers are well outside the graded runway, which extends substantially beyond the markers at either end.

Some sources have the ICAO code "SCPS" for the closed Perales Airport in the Atacama Region.

See also

Transport in Chile
List of airports in Chile

References

External links
OpenStreetMap - Pisagua

Airports in Chile
Airports in Tarapacá Region